Josh or Joshua Clark(e) may refer to:
Joshua G. Clarke (c. 1780–1828), judge in Mississippi
Josh Clarke (baseball) (1879–1962), American baseball outfielder
Josh Clark (born 1955), American stage and screen actor
Josh Clarke (footballer) (born 1994), English footballer
Josh Clarke (athlete) (born 1995), Australian sprinter
Josh Clark (host) (fl. 2000s–2010s), host of the Stuff You Should Know podcast
Joshua Clark (fl. 2000s), American author, editor and publisher
Josh Clark (politician), (born 1980), American politician